Dingqiao (Hangzhou dialect: Tinjiau) is a suburban town of Jianggan District, Hangzhou, People's Republic of China. , it has 16 residential communities (社区) and 2 villages under its administration.

See also 
List of township-level divisions of Zhejiang

References 

Towns of Zhejiang
Geography of Hangzhou